Yuki Bhambri was the defending champion but chose not to defend his title.

Dennis Novak won the title after defeating Sergiy Stakhovsky 6–2, 6–4 in the final.

Seeds
All seeds receive a bye into the second round.

Draw

Finals

Top half

Section 1

Section 2

Bottom half

Section 3

Section 4

References

External links
Main draw
Qualifying draw

Santaizi ATP Challenger - Singles
2019 Singles